Union of Salvation is a 2019 Russian war epic period adventure film directed by Andrei Kravchuk, written by Nikita Vysotskiy and Oleg Malovichko, and produced by Konstantin Ernst. The film was created in collaboration with the Cinema Direction Studios with Mosfilm Studios and Lenfilm with the support of the Russian state Cinema Foundation.

The story is about veterans of the French invasion of Russia of 1812, who conspired to install Konstantin Pavlovich as the new tsar of the Russian Empire, transform Russia into a constitutional monarchy and abolish serfdom. In Imperial Russia in 1816, several officers of the Russian Imperial Guard founded a society known as the Union of Salvation. They led a revolt in Saint Petersburg in December 1825, when about 3,000 officers and soldiers refused to swear allegiance to the new Tsar Nicholas I. This group of conspirators has become known as the Decembrist revolt. The revolt incorporated elements of the Life-Guards Moscow Regiment, Grenadier Life Guards Regiment, and Naval Equipage of the Guard.

The film shows in detail both the Decembrist uprising on Senate Square in Saint Petersburg and the uprising of the 29th Chernigov Infantry Regiment of the Imperial Russian Army, stationed in the Kiev Governorate of the Russian Empire (Chernigov is now part of Ukraine).

The main actors are: Leonid Bichevin, Maksim Matveyev, Pavel Priluchny, Ivan Yankovsky, Anton Shagin, Ivan Kolesnikov, Aleksandr Domogarov, Igor Petrenko, Sergey Peregudov, Vitali Kishchenko, Aleksei Guskov, Aleksandr Ustyugov, Sergey Koltakov, Vladislav Vetrov and Artyom Tkachenko in supporting roles.

According to the website of the Union of Cinematographers of the Russian Federation, the picture's budget in 2016 was estimated at 700 million rubles. Production of the film got underway in 2017 when Cinema Direction Studios began gathering staff to produce the film. Principal photography began in January 2018, in the cities of Saint Petersburg and Belgorod Oblast.

Union of Salvation was released in the Russian Federation by 20th Century Fox CIS (through Walt Disney Studios Motion Pictures) on December 26, 2019, in 2D, Atmos.

Plot 
In 1808, the Emperor of France, Napoleon, visits a boarding house in Paris, and asks to be shown the most talented student there. This is the son of a Russian diplomat in Paris, a subject of the Russian Empire, Sergey Muravyov-Apostol.

In 1814 the Russian army has participated in the defeat of Napoleonic France and helped capture Paris. During the review of the Life Guards of the Semyonovsky Regiment by Emperor Alexander I, the guard officers offer to drink champagne with him in honor of the victory, but the sovereign refuses.

In 1820 soldiers and veterans of the battles with Napoleon are outraged by frequent corporal punishment and excessive drill. A riot of the Life Guards of the Semyonovsky Regiment is pacified by the regimental officers Muravyov-Apostol and Bestuzhev-Ryumin, but despite this, the riot still forces the Tsar to send regiment's beloved commanders to the garrison in Little Russia, and ordinary soldiers to be driven through the ranks and sent to Siberia. Podpolkovnik Muravyov-Apostol, along with Polkovnik Pestel, leaves Saint Petersburg for the 29th Chernigov Infantry Regiment in the Kiev Governorate. Some of the officers spend a year preparing to assassinate the Tsar during his review of the troops, and subsequently march on St. Petersburg. To cover the traces of regimental funds taken for the plot, Pestel forces the stubborn Captain Mayborod at gunpoint to write a receipt saying that he borrowed the missing amount from the regimental treasury. However, Mayboroda sends a letter to Alexander I, alerting him of the conspiracy. The Emperor, himself striving for reform, cancels the review. The conspirators get off with an unspoken warning.

By 1825 the young officers are impatient for equality and freedom. For this, they are willing to sacrifice everything: their own well-being, position in society, and even their lives. Discussing the path of reform, the nobles consider whether they prefer Pavel Pestel's republican program of Russkaya Pravda ('Russian Truth"), or Nikita Muravyov's constitutional project, where Russia will remain a monarchy.

General Yushnevsky visits the Chernigov regiment and informs Pestel that Captain Mayboroda has denounced Pestel to the Tsar and revealed his plans. Pavel is summoned to Tulchin and arrested. Muravyov reports this to Mikhail Bestuzhev. The soldiers are angered and prepare a revolt.

On the morning of December 14, the Moscow infantry regiment, led by Prince Yevgeny Obolensky, Nikolai Panov, Mikhail Bestuzhev and Pyotr Kakhovsky, marches to Senate Square and prepares to attack the Senate, which has sworn allegiance to Nicholas. Governor-general Mikhail Miloradovich tries to persuade the soldiers to return to the barracks. He begins to convince them, but then Kakhovsky shoots Miloradovich in the back and Prince Obolensky stabs him with a bayonet. Realizing that the rebels would not give up, Nicholas I orders Aleksei Orlov's loyalist Horse Guards to attack and disperse them. The attack is not successful.

Nicholas then orders the artillery to shoot grapeshot/canister shots on the revolting soldiers. Many soldiers of the rebel regiments are killed, the remaining spontaneously flee to the ice of the Neva River. The rebel officers are unable to rally them. On the Neva River, officers order the surviving rebel soldiers to line up on the ice in order to capture the Peter and Paul Fortress and Arsenal. In response, Nicholas orders the artillery to be moved and the ice to be broken by its fire. Many soldiers and officers are killed by shrapnel or falling through the ice.

In January 1826 the Chernigov Regiment is marching in formation along the Rzhevsky road when suddenly they are surprised by an unexpected artillery barrage. The regiment officers notice guns and government troops opposing them. Muravyov-Apostol draws the line on the ground ahead of the troops, saying that if they cross it, a war will begin. Sergei Ivanovich takes the banner and goes ahead to negotiate. A few minutes later, Major Baranov, now demoted to a private, orders the soldiers to form up for attack. The officers are trying to dissuade the major, but Baranov convinces them with the words "Do you want him to just be killed?". The soldiers advance across the line, and the government troops open fire on them, seriously wounding Muravyov-Apostol. The Akhtyr hussars then charge the Chernigov regiment, throwing them back in defeat.

In 1826, the execution of the five leaders of the uprising takes place. While waiting on death row Sergei Muravyov-Apostol imagines an alternate version of the meeting with Alexander I where this time the Russian Tsar agrees to drink champagne with his guards.

Cast 
Most of the male performers with speaking parts in the cast played characters in the military, in particular the Imperial Russian Army. The female speaking parts represented Russian women in the nobility and royal family.

Production

Development 
The film's historical consultant was Oksana Ivanovna Kiyanskaya. 
The film Union of Salvation is a project of the Direktsiya kino (the main partner of which is state-funded Channel One of Russian television) and the company 20th Century Fox CIS. The project was initially announced in 2013. The script was written by Nikita Vysotskiy, he originally appeared as a director.
And now in the director's chair Andrei Kravchuk, who worked with the Direktsiya kino on the films Admiral, a 2008 and Viking (film), a 2016 historical was film. The first teaser pictures have appeared in theaters.

The film's cameraman, Igor Grinyakin, also previously worked on the projects of the Cinema Directorate Studio. Producers of the film were Konstantin Ernst and Anatoly Maksimov.

Filming 

Principal photography began in summer 2018 and took place the selo of Dmitriyevka, Shebekinsky District, Belgorod Oblast, playing the role of the village of Vasilkova, where the rebel regiment was seized. The place was chosen because of the similarity of natural landscapes. The objects in the hollow during the filming were grouped so that one was the background for the others. 
The movie village was created specifically for filming. It consists of 22 houses, a temple, Russian well, beehives, awnings and bridges. Now in the village a museum - a film company "Cinema Directorate Studio" donated the buildings of the local administration.

The four houses in the cinema are "game houses", they are rented not only outside but also inside. They have almost everything necessary for life, even a real Russian stove. Now there is one less building in the movie village. The drinking establishment (shinok), as required by the scenario, burned down in the Belgorod Oblast.

The events that took place in the city of Saint Petersburg had to be partially filmed in the pavilions. For the mass scene of the uprising on December 14, 1825, the largest pavilion in the country with an area of more than 40 thousand m2 was equipped. Specifically for this purpose, a chromakey was sewn, which actually covered the entire building from the inside.
Full-scale shooting took place on Palace Square, in the Peter and Paul Fortress, Tsarskoye Selo, Yusupov Palace and Saint Michael's Castle. The Grand Gatchina Palace, the town of Gatchina, Leningrad Oblast.

Exact copies were made of 1806 12-pounder guns which were used in the war with Napoleon, and then in the Senate square during the uprising.

The banners of the rebel regiments in the film exactly repeat the standards of the rebels. It took at least a month to create one canvas manually.

During the filming of the climax, the Senate square in Saint Petersburg was freezing - the air temperature dropped to -24 °C, which felt like -30 °C due to high humidity, so rosy cheeks and reddened noses are not make-up. Actors and extras were saved by thermal underwear and warmed up in vehicles in between takes.

Part of the shooting took place in a historical place: a house belonging to the Muravyev-Apostol family in Moscow.

The military and reenactors advised the crew so that the costumes, and movements and the cast of the actors were appropriate for the era. In addition to the main characters, they worked with actors of mass scenes. During the filming, about 1800 people acted in the role of soldiers, and each of them underwent special training.

Most of the costumes created for the film are military. Broadcloth for them was woven at a factory near Moscow, which preserved the traditions of production at that time.

Since the film takes place at the beginning of the 19th century, when sideburns and mustaches were in fashion, make-up artists had to make hundreds of different designs so that each actor got a set of the right color.

Gold epaulettes for uniforms were made by hand.

The craftsmen made 500 overcoats for ordinary infantrymen. With the help of parts and accessories, the costumes were modified for the filming of different regiments.

For the main characters of the film, 5-6 costumes were sewn, because in different years they served in different ranks.

Hats were made for the ladies. Handbags, umbrellas, gloves and shoes were searched at flea markets or made to order. References were sought in the literature and painting of that time.

Post-production 
The film Union of Salvation was created using the latest technology. As its creators say, it is "almost fantasy" in terms of the number of computer graphics. However, there was no need to build new worlds; the graphics were needed to restore the old ones. As a result, the viewer is able to see Petersburg exactly as the Decembrists saw it.

The scale of events is transmitted using lighting, computer graphics and photogrammetry. For example, a soldier was photographed with a device consisting of many cameras. Thus, it was possible to create 3D models of real actors, which then filled the frame. And if during the shooting of mass scenes on the site there were 300-500 artists, then on the screen there will be several times more.

For a year and a half, the entire production process was recorded on a 360-degree camera Samsung 360 Round. This is the first such experience in Russian cinema. With the help of computer graphics, Saint Petersburg was recreated in the first third of the 19th century: Saint Isaac's Cathedral stands in the woods, because then it was only being built, and the Winter Palace was pale terracotta in color.

Soundtrack

On 18 December 2019, the main premiere of Union of Salvation was held in Moscow. The musical design of the picture was done by Navigator Records (ru).

The famous film composer Dmitriy Emelyanov (ru) worked on the soundtrack for the Union of Salvation. Dmitry's original author's compositions sound in the film, including the title theme of the Union of Salvation.

The soundtrack of the film was written by composer Dmitriy Emelyanov, the theme of the song was written by singer Vasiliy Vakulenko ("Basta") and was called "Sensara". The film was produced by Hollywood Records, with Dmitriy Emelyanov processing at the request of producer, Konstantin Ernst, other famous tunes in Russia such as Mumiy Troll's "Vladivostok 2000", Nautilus Pompilius's "Water Walks", Med Dog's "Fly Away", All are played in a film accompanied by symphony. Aleksey Kozin, the film's music producer, said collaboration with Emelyanov is an interesting and enjoyable process since Emelyanov is a professional and talented person in his field.

Dmitriy Emelyanov, composer and arranger of the film, said, "It was a great pleasure for me as a musician to become part of such a large-scale project and collaborate with famous film producers - Konstantin Lvovich Ernst and Anatoly Vadimovich Maksimov".

Aleksey Kozin, musical producer of the film, said, "Cooperation with Dmitriy Emelyanov is always a very interesting and enjoyable process. Dmitriy is a true professional and talented person with his own style".

Release
Union of Salvation is the premiere of the film took place on December 18, 2019, at the Moscow cinema "October". The film was released in the Russian Federation by 20th Century Fox CIS (through Walt Disney Studios Motion Pictures) on December 26, 2019.

TV series
The preparations for the production of a TV series began in August 2020, when its producers submitted a request for support to the Russian Ministry of Culture. On January 24, 2021, filming began for the TV series named Union of Salvation: Time of Fury (Союз Спасения. Время гнева) produced by Direktsiya Kino and Konstantin Ernst from state-funded Channel One Russia who also produced the motion picture. The series is an addition and sequel to the movie. Nikita Vysotsky attached as writer and director with Anatoly Maximov as executive producer. The project is based on the idea of a more detailed description of the events presented in the film itself.

The series includes actor Kirill Kuznetsov, who plays the Chernigov Battalion soldier Mikhail Shchfilo, Anton Momot as staff officer Dmitry Shchepin-Rostovsky, Andrei Martinov as Apollyt Moraviov-Apostol, Tikhon Zhiznevsky, with most of the film's actors: Ivan Yankovsky, who returns to play Mikhail Stuhzhev-Ryumin, Anton Shagin, Maxim Matveyev, Sergei Agaponov, Pavel Vorozhzov, Leonid Bitchevin, Alexei Goskov, Ivan Kolesnikov, Alex  Pavel Prilucniy and Igor Petrenko.

Reception
The film was released on December 26, 2019. It was the most expensive Russian film of the year, with a budget of 980 million RUB (roughly $16.1 million at exchange rates at the time).

Critical response
Film critic Egor Moskvitin in an interview with Kommersant FM radio station noted:
On the one hand, you can really perceive this movie as complementary to young people, idealists who are ready to give their lives for the fatherland. On the other hand, this film can be interpreted as the story that any upheaval leads to even greater tragedies. The rush of the Decembrists was more idealistic than sensible.

In turn, the critic of the network publication "Kanobu.Ru" Angelina Gura said:
There are many characters and they are disclosed exactly as much as a two-hour film allows about one of the most famous events of the past. Therefore, the Union of Salvation can be attributed to the category of historical films only, without any life inside.

According to S.N. Rudnik, head of the Department of History of St. Petersburg Mining University, the film, although it contains a number of distortions of historical facts (for example, the dialogue between Nicholas I and S. Trubetskoy), should not be criticized, because it is artistic, and in no way a documentary film, moreover, it is impossible to reproduce all the nuances of the development of the Decembrists movement within the framework of one picture.

Union of Salvation received seven awards in Russia: for best supporting actor (Alexander Domogarov), cinematography, visual effects, costumes, makeup, sound engineer and production designer.

See also
 The Decembrists (1927), a Soviet silent historical drama film
 The Captivating Star of Happiness (1975), a Soviet film

References

External links 
 Official website 
 

2019 films
2010s Russian-language films
Films directed by Andrei Kravchuk
2010s historical adventure films
2019 war drama films
2010s action adventure films
Russian historical adventure films
Films about rebellions
Films about the Russian Empire
Historical epic films
Russian epic films
Russian war drama films
Films set in 1808
Films set in 1814
Films set in 1820
Films set in 1825
Films set in 1826
War epic films
Russian adventure drama films
War adventure films
Historical action films
Russian biographical films
Biographical action films
Films set in Europe
Russian films about revenge
Films about the French invasion of Russia
Films set in Saint Petersburg
Films set in the Russian Empire
War films based on actual events
Napoleonic Wars films
Biographical films about military personnel
20th Century Fox films
Films shot in Moscow
Films shot in Saint Petersburg
Films shot in Russia
2019 drama films
Depictions of Napoleon on film
Cultural depictions of Nicholas I of Russia